Bay St. Louis is a city in and the county seat of Hancock County, Mississippi, in the United States. Located on the Gulf Coast on the west side of the Bay of St. Louis, it is part of the Gulfport–Biloxi Metropolitan Statistical Area. As of 2010, Bay St. Louis’ population was 9,260.

History
The first European settlers in this area were French colonists, whose culture still influences the small city and who imported enslaved people from Africa. A Louisiana Creole population developed, featuring people of color as well as white colonists of largely French descent.

The county was organized by European Americans, who named it after John Hancock, who was a Founding Father of the United States. While more Protestant Americans migrated into this area after Indian Removal in the 1830s, there are still many Catholic families, some dating to both African and French ancestors of the colonial era. Roman Catholic schools still draw area students.

The 1966 movie This Property is Condemned starring Natalie Wood and Robert Redford was filmed in Bay St. Louis, which was called "Dodson" in the movie, with some additional shooting in Biloxi, Mississippi, and New Orleans, Louisiana.

Geography
Bay St. Louis is located in southeastern Hancock County at 30°18'53" North, 89°20'39" West (30.314696, −89.344096). It is situated on the west side of the Bay of St. Louis which empties into the Mississippi Sound, adjacent to Pass Christian to the east. The city is bordered to the north by the Jourdan River, the primary inlet of the bay and Diamondhead. The eastern border of the city is the Harrison County line in the middle of the bay.

Major highways
I-10 leads east  to Biloxi and southwest  to New Orleans.
  U.S. Highway 90 passes just north of downtown Bay St. Louis, leading east across the St. Louis Bay Bridge to Pass Christian.
  Mississippi Highway 603  runs along the western edge of the Bay St. Louis city limits, connecting US 90 and Interstate 10.

Adjacent cities and towns
 Diamondhead (north)
 Pass Christian (east)
 Waveland (west)

Demographics

2020 census

As of the 2020 United States census, there were 9,284 people, 5,995 households, and 3,562 families residing in the city.

2000 census
As of the census of 2000, there were 8,209 people, 3,271 households, and 2,064 families residing in the city. The population density was 1,342.1 people per square mile (517.9/km). There were 3,817 housing units at an average density of 624.1 per square mile (240.8/km). The racial makeup of the city was 80.23% White, 16.59% African American, 0.40% Native American, 1.11% Asian, 0.05% Pacific Islander, 0.19% from other races, and 1.43% from two or more races. 1.68% of the population was Hispanic or Latino of any race.

There were 3,271 households, out of which 29.6% had children under the age of 18 living with them, 44.0% were married couples living together, 14.7% had a female householder with no husband present, and 36.9% were non-families. 31.5% of all households were made up of individuals, and 12.6% had someone living alone who was 65 years of age or older. The average household size was 2.41 and the average family size was 3.05.

In the city, the population was 24.5% under the age of 18, 7.6% from 18 to 24, 26.8% from 25 to 44, 24.5% from 45 to 64, and 16.6% who were 65 years of age or older. The median age was 39 years. For every 100 females, there were 92.0 males. For every 100 females age 18 and over, there were 88.0 males. The median income for a household in the city was $34,106, and the median income for a family was $41,957. Males had a median income of $32,261 versus $21,308 for females. The per capita income for the city was $18,483. 13.2% of the population and 10.0% of families were below the poverty line. Out of the total population, 17.2% of those under the age of 18 and 11.5% of those 65 and older were living below the poverty line.

Education
Almost all of the city of Bay St. Louis is served by the Bay St. Louis-Waveland School District. Small portions of land are within the Hancock County School District.

It is the home of Bay High School. In addition to Bay High, there are private Catholic schools: Saint Stanislaus College, a residency and day school for boys grades 7–12; and Our Lady Academy, a day school for girls grades 7–12. The latter two share some classrooms as well as a Roman Catholic curriculum.

All of Hancock County is in the service area of Pearl River Community College.

Hurricanes 

On August 17, 1969, Hurricane Camille made landfall at the tip of Louisiana before continuing to Bay St. Louis.

On August 29, 2005, at 10:00 a.m. CDT, Hurricane Katrina made its final landfall just west of Bay St. Louis, at the mouth of the Pearl River, causing a  storm surge.

USGS topographic maps show a common  elevation contour line running throughout a ridge along the former routing of Highway 90 (Old Spanish Trail) on the western edge of the city. As higher ground, this area was spared inundation from the storm surge of Hurricane Katrina.

Katrina damaged more than 40 Mississippi libraries, including severe roof and water damage to the Bay St. Louis Public Library. The library reopened to the public on October 12, 2005.

The Bay St. Louis Bridge on US Highway 90 was severely damaged, with many bridge sections down-dropped at the west edges. The destroyed bridge was replaced by a new Bay St. Louis Bridge, which received America's Transportation Award. It includes a pedestrian bridge with an art walk featuring the works of local artists.

The underground utility infrastructure in Bay St. Louis received a federally funded total overhaul and replacement.

Climate
The climate in this area is characterized by hot, humid summers and generally mild to cool winters.  According to the Köppen Climate Classification system, Bay St. Louis has a humid subtropical climate, abbreviated "Cfa" on climate maps.

Notable people
 Stephen E. Ambrose, historian and author
 Richmond Barthé, sculptor associated with the Harlem Renaissance
 J. P. Compretta, former member of the Mississippi House of Representatives
 Leo Fabian Fahey, coadjutor bishop of the Diocese of Baker City, Oregon from 1948 until 1950
 Shannon Garrett, former professional Canadian football player
 Walter J. Gex III, United States district judge of the United States District Court for the Southern District of Mississippi
 Jacob Lindgren, MLB player
 Philip Moran, member of the Mississippi State Senate
 Alice Moseley, folk artist
 Leo Norris, former infielder for the Philadelphia Phillies
 Carlile Pollock Patterson, fourth superintendent of the United States Coast Survey
 Albert J. Raboteau, is an African-American scholar of African and African-American religions
 Lawrence E. Roberts, pilot with the Tuskegee Airmen and colonel in the United States Air Force
 John Scafide, former offensive lineman for the Boston Redskins and mayor of Bay St. Louis from 1953 to 1969
 Caroline Snedeker, children's author
 Gene Taylor, member of the United States House of Representatives from 1989 to 2011
 Tank Williams, former NFL player

See also

 List of cities in Mississippi

References

External links

 

 
Cities in Mississippi
Cities in Hancock County, Mississippi
County seats in Mississippi
Gulfport–Biloxi metropolitan area
Populated coastal places in Mississippi
French-American culture in Mississippi